Spartak Stadium is a multi-purpose stadium in Novosibirsk, Russia.  It is currently used mostly for football matches and is the home ground of FC Novosibirsk.  The stadium holds 12,500 people.

It is the most easterly venue to have hosted a match in UEFA club competition.

References

 

Football venues in Russia
Buildings and structures in Novosibirsk
Sport in Novosibirsk
Multi-purpose stadiums in Russia
FC Sibir Novosibirsk
FC Novosibirsk
Tsentralny City District, Novosibirsk